Avery is an unincorporated community in Michigan Township, Clinton County, Indiana.

History
A post office was established at Avery in 1879, and remained in operation until it was discontinued in 1903. The community was named for Jacob Avery, a pioneer settler.

Geography

References

Unincorporated communities in Clinton County, Indiana
Unincorporated communities in Indiana